Coptis quinquesecta is a species of goldthread native to Jinping County, Yunnan, China and locally in northern Vietnam.  China has it as a national key thread species in order to conserve it. It has 79 protein coding genes, 30 RNA transferring genes, as well as four ribosomal RNA genes adding up to a total of 113 genes.

Coptis quinquesecta is used as a medicinal herb - it contains berberine and coptisine, which are used to treat bacterial infections, the effects of diabetes, and high blood pressure.

References

quinquesecta